Bridget Emmett  is a British ecologist, Professor and Science Area Head for the UK Centre for Ecology & Hydrology. She is the President of British Ecological Society from 2024.

Early life and education 
Emmett studied plant sciences at the University of Aberdeen. She moved to the University of Exeter as a doctoral researcher, where she studied the impact of harvesting on soil nitrogen transformation.

Research and career 
Emmett believes that soils is one of the “most underrated and little understood wonders on our fragile planet,”. Since 2001 Emmett has led the Solis and Land Use Science Area at the UK Centre for Ecology & Hydrology. Her research considers soils, ecology and biogeochemistry. She worked as an advisor to the Government of the United Kingdom, providing insight on soil health.

From 2024 Emmett will serve as President of the British Ecological Society. She is one of the nine experts that will advise the British Ecological Society on the future of ecological research.

Awards and honours 

 2015 Elected Fellow of the Learned Society of Wales
 2016 Marsh Award for Climate Change Research
 2022 Appointed to the Order of the British Empire

Select publications

References 

Year of birth missing (living people)
Living people
British ecologists
Women ecologists
20th-century British scientists
20th-century British women scientists
21st-century British scientists
21st-century British women scientists
British soil scientists
Alumni of the University of Aberdeen
Alumni of the University of Exeter
Alumni of Bangor University
Fellows of the Learned Society of Wales
Members of the Order of the British Empire